Claude Spanghero (born 5 June 1948) is a former French rugby union footballer. 
He was  a part of the French side which won the Five Nations in 1973. He played for France over 22 times and 7 with his Brother Walter Spanghero. He played at number 8 and Lock. He famously had a very stormy relationship with his brother, Walter,  who was also an international rugby player for France.

Honours 
 French rugby champion, 1979 with RC Narbonne
 French championship finalist 1974 with RC Narbonne
 Challenge Yves du Manoir 1973, 1974, 1978 and 1979 with RC Narbonne

External links
 Claude Spanghero on scrum.com

1948 births
French rugby union players
Living people
Rugby union locks
French people of Italian descent
France international rugby union players